Gladys Boateng (born 1949)  is a Ghanaian politician and also a teacher. She served as a member of parliament for Tema west constituency in Greater Accra Region of Ghana in the First Parliament of the Fourth Republic of Ghana.

Early life and education 
Gladys Boateng was born on 2 June 1949. She has a diploma in Art Education at Cert 'A' Specialist Training College.

Career 
Gladys Boateng was a former member of the First Parliament of the Fourth Republic of Ghana. She was sworn into office on 7 January 1993 and served till 6th January 1997.

Politics 
Gladys Boateng was elected into parliament during the 1992 Ghanaian parliamentary election on the ticket of the National Democratic Congress as a member of the First Parliament of the Fourth Republic of Ghana.

She was preceded by Seth Laryea Tetteh who was the Member of Parliament for Tema in the 3rd Republic of Ghana and was succeeded by Abraham Ossei-Aidooh of the New Patriotic Party in 1996 Ghanaian general election who won the election with 22,521 votes which is equivalent to 46.50% of the share by defeating Esther Ilan-Agbodo Ogbogu of the National Democratic Congress who obtained 15,511 votes which is equivalent to 32.00% of the share and George Alfred Ackah of  Convention People's Party who obtained no votes.

Personal life 
Gladys Boateng is a Christian.

References 

1949 births
Living people
National Democratic Congress (Ghana) politicians
Ghanaian educators
Ghanaian MPs 1993–1997
Ghanaian Christians
People from Greater Accra Region